Marystown is an unincorporated community in Louisville Township, Scott County, Minnesota, United States, near Shakopee.  The community is located along Scott County Road 15 and 160th Street West.

References

Unincorporated communities in Minnesota
Unincorporated communities in Scott County, Minnesota